Cheng Li-chun (born 19 June 1969) is a Taiwanese politician.

Early life
Cheng is Hoklo Taiwanese, her ancestors came directly from southeastern Fujian. Cheng obtained her bachelor's degree in philosophy from National Taiwan University in 1992 and master's degree in philosophy, politics, economics and sociology from Paris West University Nanterre La Défense in France.

Ministry of Culture
Cheng was appointed the Minister of Culture on 20 May 2016. In April 2017, Cheng proposed a five-year infrastructure development program targeting Taiwanese historical sites to the Education and Culture Committee of the Legislative Yuan. The plan set aside NT$5.66 billion for maintenance of historic sites and NT$15.8 billion for digital infrastructure construction. She stepped down from the position on 20 May 2020, and was replaced by Lee Yung-te.

Later career
Cheng is a translator of French-language works to Chinese.

References

1969 births
Living people
National Taiwan University alumni
Taiwanese people of Hoklo descent
Taiwanese Ministers of Culture
University of Paris alumni
Democratic Progressive Party Members of the Legislative Yuan
Politicians of the Republic of China on Taiwan from Taipei
Party List Members of the Legislative Yuan
Members of the 8th Legislative Yuan
Members of the 9th Legislative Yuan
Women government ministers of Taiwan
Taiwanese expatriates in France
French–Chinese translators
Taiwanese translators